Joseph Lanier Williams (October 23, 1810December 14, 1865) was an American politician that represented Tennessee's third district in the United States House of Representatives.

Biography
Williams was born near Knoxville, Tennessee on October 23, 1810. After completing preparatory studies, he attended the University of East Tennessee, and attended the United States Military Academy at West Point. He studied law, was admitted to the bar, and commenced practice in Knoxville, Tennessee. He married Malinda R. Williams and they had four children.

Career
Williams was elected as a Whig to the Twenty-fifth, Twenty-sixth, and Twenty-seven Congresses. He served from March 4, 1837 to March 3, 1843.  He was an unsuccessful candidate for renomination in 1842. He engaged in the practice of law in Washington, D.C.

Appointed judge of the Dakota Territorial Supreme Court by President Abraham Lincoln, Williams served in that capacity from 1861 to 1865. Historian Doane Robinson wrote of Williams, and his contemporary B. P. Williston, that "[n]either Williston or Williams left a record, or made an impression from which any adequate judgment of their efficiency may be ascertained".

Death
Williams died in Knoxville, Tennessee on December 14, 1865 (age 55 years, 52 days). He is interred in Old Gray Cemetery in Knoxville. He was the son of U.S. Senator John Williams.

References

External links

1810 births
1865 deaths
Politicians from Knoxville, Tennessee
United States Military Academy alumni
Tennessee lawyers
Dakota Territory judges
19th-century American judges
Whig Party members of the United States House of Representatives from Tennessee
19th-century American politicians
19th-century American lawyers